Urf Ghanta is a 2021 Indian Hindi comedy film written and directed by Aayush Saxena, starring Mukesh S. Bhatt, Pamela Singh Bhutoria, Samridhi Chandola, Ram Naresh Diwakar, Rajendra Gupta, Mohan Kapur, Ravi Kishan, Sunita Rajwar, and Chitrashi Rawat.

Plot
The movie begins when a bus driver sees a nude man. This nude man named Ghanta or Ghanteshwar is the protagonist.

Urf Ghanta is the story of a forty-year-old unmarried man who is looking for a wife. The Gods do not help Ghanta to achieve his goal though he is devout. His best friend Sudama tries to help him, but without success.

Cast
Jitu Shivhare as Ghanta
Mukesh S. Bhatt
Pamela Singh Bhutoria as Jagmeera
Samridhi Chandola as Meenakshi
Ram Naresh Diwakar as Sudama
Rajendra Gupta as Doctor
Mohan Kapur as Unknown Stranger
Ravi Kishan as Shiva God
Sunita Rajwar as Ghanta's chachi
Chitrashi Rawat as Lollypop
Himanshu Sharma as Guddan
Vijay kumar Dogra as Piddi Chacha

References

External links
 

2021 comedy films